Bolsherechensky District is an administrative and municipal district (raion), one of the thirty-two in Omsk Oblast, Russia. It is located in the center of the oblast. Its administrative center is the urban locality (a work settlement) of Bolsherechye. Population: 28,486 (2010 Census);  The population of Bolsherechye accounts for 39.6% of the district's total population.

References

Notes

Sources

Districts of Omsk Oblast